Emma Martín Queralt (born 13 August 2002) is a Spanish footballer who plays as a midfielder for Real Oviedo Femenino.

Club career
Martín started her career at Cambrils.

References

External links
Profile at La Liga

2002 births
Living people
Women's association football midfielders
Spanish women's footballers
People from Baix Ebre
Sportspeople from the Province of Tarragona
Footballers from Catalonia
Deportivo Alavés Gloriosas players
Primera División (women) players
Segunda Federación (women) players
Sportswomen from Catalonia